Liverpool Wavertree by-election may refer to one of two parliamentary by-elections held for the British House of Commons constituency of Liverpool Wavertree:

1931 Liverpool Wavertree by-election
1935 Liverpool Wavertree by-election

See also

Liverpool Wavertree (UK Parliament constituency)